Urceola micrantha is a plant species in the genus Urceola. It is a shrub widespread across much of East Asia, Southeast Asia, and the Himalayas.

In Taïwan, it is used in folk medicine as an analgesic, antiphlogistic and spasmolytic agent.

The species contains proanthocyanidin B2, proanthocyanidin A1 and proanthocyanidin A2.

References

Apocyneae
Flora of Asia
Medicinal plants
Plants described in 1837